Herreys, sometimes Herrey's or Herrey, is a Swedish pop group, consisting of the three brothers Per Herrey (born 9 August 1958), Richard Herrey (born 19 August 1964), and Louis Herrey (born 3 November 1966). They won the Eurovision Song Contest 1984 with the song "Diggi-Loo Diggi-Ley". Richard and Louis Herrey became the first teenage males to win Eurovision and remain the youngest ever male winners, being 19 years and 260 days and 17 years and 184 days of age respectively. In 1985, they won the Sopot International Song Festival with "Sommarparty". At the time Herreys won Eurovision, the brothers were living and working as singers in Cleveland, Ohio, United States. 
Herreys continued to record and tour for a few years, but had no hits of the same magnitude as the Eurovision winner. They were the first European boyband preceding the international boom a few years later. Herreys was the bestselling pop group in Sweden in the 1980s, and enjoyed enormous success touring and performing in excess of 300 live shows. Herreys was also the first Western band to be invited to tour behind the Iron Curtain in the Soviet Union, and also did shows with the big Russian star Alla Pugacheva.

The three brothers reunited to perform "Diggi-Loo Diggi-Ley" in the intermission of one of the Swedish Melodifestivalen semifinals of 2002. Richard Herrey made an appearance at Congratulations, a 50th anniversary concert, held in Copenhagen, Denmark in October 2005. In February 2006, Richard Herrey released his first solo album, Jag e Kung. They performed at Eurovision Song Contest's Greatest Hits, the 60th anniversary show in 2015.

Discography

Albums 
 1984: Diggi Loo, Diggi Ley
 1985: Crazy People
 1985: Not Funny
 1986: Different I's
 1987: Live in Tivoli
 1994: Där vindarna möts
 1995: Herreys Story
 2002: Gyllene Hits
 2010: The Greatest Hits

Singles 
 "Crazy people" / "I'm so sorry"
 "You" / "I see the love"
 "Kall som is" / "Mirror mirror"
 (#18 in Sweden) (1984)
 "Diggi-Loo-Diggi-Ley" (1984)
 (#2 in Sweden, #5 in Norway, #10 in Switzerland, #11 in Germany, #18 in Denmark, #46 in UK)
 "People say it's in the air" / "I'm so sorry"
 "Varje liten droppe regn" (EP)
 (#11 in Sweden)
 "People from Ibiza" / "Sommarparty"
 (#20 in Sweden)
 "Din telefon" / "Why Why"
 "Chinese Temptation" / "Sweet Love"
 "Freedom" / "Little Pretty Girl"
 "Min ensamma vrå" / "Livet i dig"
 "Öppna dina ögon" / "Hanna"
 "Här vill jag leva" / "Hon ger dig allt"

References

External links
Richard Herrey's website
Louis Herrey's blog
Per Herrey's website
Återförening i gyllene skor 

Sopot International Song Festival winners
Eurovision Song Contest winners
Eurovision Song Contest entrants for Sweden
Eurovision Song Contest entrants of 1984
Melodifestivalen contestants
Melodifestivalen winners
Swedish boy bands
Swedish Latter Day Saints
Swedish musical trios
Musical groups established in 1984
Year of disestablishment missing 
Musical groups reestablished in 2002
1984 establishments in Sweden
1958 births
Living people
Sibling musical trios
English-language singers from Sweden